Harmonium was the eponymous debut album by Québécois band Harmonium released in 1974. It was their most folk driven album, and features the song that made them famous "Pour un instant". It features nowhere near as exotic instrumentation as on their later albums, mostly sticking to simple guitar and bass arrangements, with occurrences of drums on a few songs.

Track listing

Side one 
 "Harmonium" (Serge Fiori, Michel Normandeau) – 6:36
 "Si doucement" (Fiori) – 4:25
 "Aujourd'hui, je dis bonjour à la vie" (Fiori) – 5:44
 "Vieilles courroies" (Fiori, Normandeau) – 5:47
 "100,000 raisons" (Fiori, Normandeau) – 3:42
 Not on the original vinyl, it was introduced in the reedited CD.

Side two 
 "Attends-moi" (Fiori, Normandeau) – 4:40
 "Pour un instant" (Fiori, Normandeau) – 3:21
 "De la chambre au salon" (Fiori) – 5:43
 "Un musicien parmi tant d'autres" (Fiori) – 7:05

Personnel 
 Serge Fiori – lead vocals, backing vocals, acoustic guitar
 Michel Normandeau – backing vocals, acoustic guitar
 Louis Valois – bass guitar
 Rejean Emond – drums
 Alan Penfold – flugelhorn

Charts

Certifications

Harmonium (band) albums
1974 debut albums
PolyGram albums